Qataat or Qateat may refer to:
 Qataat, Lorestan